There are two rivers named Jacoca River in Brazil:

 Jacoca River (Paraíba)
 Jacoca River (Sergipe)